WKOX (1430 kHz, "Buenas Nuevas Boston") is a commercial AM radio station owned by the Delmarva Educational Association. It broadcasts a Spanish Christian format. The station is licensed to Everett, Massachusetts and targets Boston and its suburbs. It broadcasts from radio studios in Medford. The transmitter site is also in Medford at a separate location.

History
The station signed on January 20, 1952, as WHIL, a daytime-only station based in Medford, Massachusetts. After an attempt to program pop music, the station flipped to country music in the 1960s, and added an FM station, WHIL-FM 107.9, which simulcast the AM during the day and continued with similar programming at night.

In 1972, the FM was changed from WHIL-FM to WWEL-FM, and both stations switched to a format of instrumental versions of pop hits and show tunes known as beautiful music, with the stations simulcast most of the day. A couple of years later, WHIL became WWEL, to match the FM station's call sign.

In early 1979, after the stations were sold, the call letters were changed to WXKS and WXKS-FM, with the "KS" in the call letters representing the word "Kiss". Both stations launched a disco format (mostly, but not completely, simulcast), with the FM (Kiss 108) soon becoming one of Boston's most popular radio stations, although the AM had very few listeners. The FM side eventually made a very successful transition from disco to mainstream top 40; by that time, however, the AM no longer had the same format as the FM.

From December 1979 until late 2004, WXKS was an adult standards-format station, which at first carried the Music of Your Life format, with the music played by local personalities. For a time in the 1980s, WXKS became quite successful, especially among older listeners, in spite of its daytime status. Later, WXKS went to 24-hours-a-day operation and broadcast programming from both the Music of Your Life and AM Only/America's Best Music satellite networks, along with a local morning show during the early 2000s.

In late 2004, WXKS made a format change to liberal talk, for the most part carrying programming from the Air America radio network. Since the WXKS nighttime signal is very directional, sister station 1200 WKOX in Framingham also broadcast the same programming.

At noon on December 21, 2006, the stations dropped the progressive talk format in favor of a Spanish tropical format called "Rumba."

On September 4, 2009, WXKS split from the simulcast with WKOX and flipped to Spanish-language Top 40, branded "Mia 1430," using the format from Premium Choice.  The two stations then swapped call letters on March 1, 2010, as part of 1200 AM's transition to a conservative talk format.

The conservative talk format that had been on WXKS reappeared on WKOX in 2015. WXKS had given up the format in 2012, and the two stations that had bought the programming that had been on WXKS, WRKO (The Rush Limbaugh Show) and WMEX (The Sean Hannity Show and the Glenn Beck Radio Program), discontinued the shows in two separate moves in 2015. WKOX confirmed the news on June 25, 2015, with the station opting for the Premiere Networks conservative talk lineup (which, in addition to Hannity, Limbaugh, and Beck's programs, included Buck Sexton and Jason Lewis) plus a tape-delayed broadcast of Westwood One's The Mark Levin Show; overnight and morning drive programming was supplied by Fox Sports Radio. While conservative talk shows were on the air, national news from Fox News Radio was heard at the beginning of each hour.

On November 1, 2017, iHeartMedia disclosed that it was selling WKOX to comply with Federal Communications Commission (FCC) ownership limits following its proposed acquisition of WBZ, WRKO, WKAF, and WZLX. The move comes due to the merger of CBS Radio and Entercom, with both companies needing to divest stations to different owners to meet ownership limits and revenue concentration limits set by the FCC and the Department of Justice. The divestment into the trust was completed on December 19. On March 1, 2018, iHeartMedia moved the conservative talk format back to WXKS; WKOX then switched to a Spanish-language hit music format and revived the "Rumba" branding.

On April 30, 2020, iHeartMedia announced that the trust would be donating WKOX to Delmarva Educational Association. On August 11, 2020, after the sale closed, WKOX flipped to gospel music as "1430 The Light." iHeart would revive the "Rumba" branding and Spanish CHR format on WKAF (now WZRM) in May 2021. On March 29, 2021, WKOX changed its format to Spanish Christian, branded as "Buenas Nuevas Radio".

HD Radio
WKOX is currently broadcasting on HD IBOC Radio. The station also broadcast on HD2 signal of sister station WBWL until December 19, 2017.

Previous logo

References

External links

Radio stations established in 1952
KOX
Medford, Massachusetts
Mass media in Middlesex County, Massachusetts
KOX
KOX
1952 establishments in Massachusetts